Basnayake Mudiyanselage Bandula Basnayake (born 20 January 1947) is a Sri Lankan politician, a former member of the Parliament of Sri Lanka and a former government minister.

References

1947 births
Living people
Members of the 10th Parliament of Sri Lanka
Members of the 13th Parliament of Sri Lanka
Government ministers of Sri Lanka
Sri Lanka Freedom Party politicians
United People's Freedom Alliance politicians